Katarina Peović  (born in Zagreb on November 16, 1974), is a Croatian politician and media and culture researcher. From March to September 2018, she was a representative of the Workers' Front party in Zagreb Assembly. On January 21, 2019, Katarina Peović announced her candidacy for the Croatian presidential elections in 2019 as a candidate of the Workers' Front party, and established media presence in the candidates' confrontations. In the 2020 parliamentary elections, she was elected as a member of the Croatian Parliament and was a member of the Green–Left Coalition. In the 2021 local elections, she ran for mayor of Rijeka.

Biography 
Katarina Peović was born in Zagreb on November 16, 1974. She graduated in comparative literature and Croatian language and literature at the Faculty of Humanities and Social Sciences in Zagreb (1993 – 1999). From 2004 do 2005 she worked as an assistant at the Institute for Social Research in Zagreb. Since 2005, she has been working at the Department of Cultural Studies at the University of Rijeka (2005 assistant, 2012. assistant professor,, 2019. associate professor), where she teaches courses in the field and culture theory. She was the editor of the literary and theoretical magazine Libra Libera (1999 – 2017), a member of the editorial board of Zarez (2004 – 2009) and the editor of the radio cultural and media show Elektrosfera Third Program of HR (2008 – 2009). She edited the collection of texts by the American theorist Hakim Bey The Temporary Autonomous Zone and Other Texts (2003). She is the author of a dozen scientific papers and several articles in anthologies.

Political activity 
In January 2018, after the expiration of the rotating mandate of Mate Kapović, Katarina Peović entered Zagreb Assembly as a rotating representative of Workers' Front.

On May 7 2018 the proposal of the Workers' Front (and thus the Left Bloc) was successfully voted in Zagreb Assembly that the City should help the workers of companies Kamensko and Dioki by purchasing part of the workers' claim in the same amount in which these companies have paid utility fees in bankruptcy. Subsequently, the mayor Milan Bandić, strictly opposed to the proposal to purchase the workers' claims, convened an extraordinary session in order to refute the proposal.

On September 13, 2018, at the end of the rotating mandate, she was replaced by Miljenka Ćurković.

On January 21, 2019 Workers' Front, at a conference for the media and the public, announced the candidacy of its member, Katarina Peović, for the presidential elections in Croatia.
They also presented a program for democratic socialism in the 21st century. In most of the live media confrontations, Peović dominated the duels with other candidates and was considered one of the key factors behind the relatively late loss of votes for the right wing candidate Miroslav Škoro.

Works 

 Media and Culture: Ideology of Media after Decentralization (Mediji i kultura : ideologija medija nakon decentralizacije). Zagreb 2012., online edition 2014.
 Marx in Digital Age: Dialectic Materialism at the Doors of Technology (Marx u digitalnom dobu : dijalektički materijalizam na vratima tehnologije). Zagreb 2016.

Sources 

Living people

1974 births
University of Zagreb alumni
Academic staff of the University of Rijeka
Croatian atheists
Croatian women academics
Representatives in the modern Croatian Parliament
Socialist politicians